Tybalmia mydas is a species of beetle in the family Cerambycidae. It was described by Hippolyte Lucas in 1859. It is known from Brazil.

References

Onciderini
Beetles described in 1859